The women's mass start in the 2013–14 ISU Speed Skating World Cup was contested over two races on two occasions, out of a total of six World Cup occasions for the season, with the first occasion involving the event taking place in Inzell, Germany, on 7–9 March 2014, and the second occasion taking place in Heerenveen, Netherlands, on 14–16 March 2014. The races were over 15 laps.

Francesca Lollobrigida of Italy won the cup, while Irene Schouten of the Netherlands came second, and Janneke Ensing of the Netherlands came third. The defending champion, Kim Bo-reum of South Korea, did not participate this season.

Top three

Race medallists

Standings 
Standings as of 14 March 2014 (end of the season).

References 

 
Women mass start
ISU